Margarinotus hudsonicus is a species of clown beetle in the family Histeridae. It is found in North America.

References

Further reading

 
 

Histeridae
Beetles of North America
Beetles described in 1893
Taxa named by Thomas Lincoln Casey Jr.
Articles created by Qbugbot